The Adelaide class of six guided missile frigates was constructed in Australia and the United States of America for service in the Royal Australian Navy. Two were later sold to the Chilean Navy.

The Adelaide class was based on the United States Navy's Oliver Hazard Perry-class frigates,but modified for Australian requirements. The first four vessels were built in the United States, and the final two were constructed in Australia. The first ship entered service in November 1980. 

Canberra and Adelaide were paid off in 2005 and 2008, respectively, and later sunk as dive wrecks. Their decommissioning offset the cost of a A$1 billion weapons and equipment upgrade to the remaining four ships. As the Hobart-class air-warfare destroyers entered service beginning in 2016, the remaining Adelaide class ships were progressively decommissioned beginning with Sydney in 2015. Darwin followed in 2017, and Newcastle and Melbourne went last in 2019. The final two were sold to Chile in 2020.

Construction and acquisition

Following the cancellation of the Australian light destroyer project in 1973, the British Type 42 destroyer and the American Oliver Hazard Perry-class frigate were identified as alternatives. Although the Type 42 met the RAN's requirements as a replacement for the cancelled light destroyers and the Daring-class destroyers, fitting the ship with the SM-1 missile would have been difficult. On the other hand, the Perry class was still at the design stage; a design that was described by assessment project staff as "a second rate escort that falls short of the DDL [light destroyer] requirements on virtually every respect". Despite this, the Australian government approved the purchase of two US-built Perry-class ships in 1974.

The risk of acquiring an unproven design was seen as acceptable because of the success of the USN's Charles F. Adams-class destroyer (of which the RAN operated three ships as the Perth class), when compared to the equivalent British ships the RAN would have purchased. Final government approval to order two ships was granted in 1976, with a third ship ordered in 1977. The order was expanded in April 1980 with the order of a fourth unit. These four ships were built by Todd Pacific Shipyards of Seattle, Washington, as part of the USN's shipbuilding program, and were assigned USN hull numbers during construction, which were replaced with RAN pennant numbers upon entering service. The first, HMAS Adelaide (USN hull number FFG-17, RAN pennant number FFG 01) was built to the Flight I design, while Canberra (FFG-18/FFG 02) and Sydney (FFG-35/FFG 03) were the first and last ships of the Flight II design, respectively. The final American-built ship was Darwin (FFG-44/FFG 04); constructed to the Flight III design. In 1980, two more ships (Melbourne and Newcastle) were ordered, but were built in Australia by AMECON of Williamstown, Victoria, and did not receive USN numbers.

Armament
From the withdrawal of the Perth-class destroyers in 2001 until the introduction of the Hobart-class in 2017, these ships were the RAN's primary air defence vessels, armed with a Mark 13 missile launcher for SM-2 missiles. They also have significant anti-surface capability, being armed with a  Mk 75 gun and the Harpoon ASM (also fired by the Mark 13 launcher), and a pair of triple torpedo tubes for ASW. In addition, two S-70B Seahawk helicopters are carried.

From 2005 onwards, all RAN frigates deploying to the Persian Gulf are fitted with two M2HB .50 calibre machine guns in Mini Typhoon mounts, installed on the aft corners of the hangar roof. Two TopLite EO directors are used with the guns.

The Australian frigates were originally fitted with American Mark 46 anti-submarine torpedoes, but by 2008, they had been replaced with the European MU90 Impact torpedo in three of the four frigates as part of the FFG Upgrade, with the conversion of Newcastle underway at that point.

Upgrades
There have been two major upgrades distinguishing the Adelaide class from the American Oliver Hazard Perry-class frigates.

Lengthening
The first three ships were constructed to the Perry class' 'short' hull design (Flight I and II), with an identical length for both the main deck and the keel. Ships from FFG-36 onwards (including Darwin) were built with an increase in overall length—achieved by angling the transom (the section between the fantail and the keel) to increase the area of the flight deck and allow the operation of Seahawk helicopters. Adelaide, Canberra, and Sydney were later upgraded to match the slightly larger ships, and were fitted with the updated sonars and ESM systems of the Flight III design.

FFG Upgrade

In the mid-1990s, Paul Keating's Labor government decided to retain the Adelaide-class frigates instead of replacing them with the more expensive and more labour-intensive, but much more capable Kidd-class destroyers that the U.S. Navy was selling off. Upgrades to the Perry-class were problematic, due to "little reserved space for growth (39 tons in the original design), and the inflexible, proprietary electronics of the time", such that the "US Navy gave up on the idea of upgrades to face new communications realities and advanced missile threats". The U.S. Navy had decommissioned 25 "FFG-7 Short" ships via "bargain basement sales to allies or outright retirement, after an average of only 18 years of service".

Keating's administration was succeeded by the Liberal government of John Howard, which commenced SEA 1390, also known as the FFG Upgrade Project. Originally costing A$1 billion, which eventually increased to A$1.46 billion, the project included improvements to the combat and fire control system, the sonar suite, and the air defence missiles. The upgrade was for four ships and intended to expand their service life to approximately 2020. The project cost was partly offset by the decommissioning of the two oldest units: Canberra paying off in 2005 and Adelaide in 2008. Modification of each ship took place at Garden Island Dockyard, with Australian Defence Industries (ADI, now Thales Australia) selected as project leader for the upgrade phase of the project.

By January 2008, the FFG Upgrade Project was running at least four years behind schedule. The frigates' anti-missile and anti-torpedo detection and defence systems could not be integrated as intended, leaving the ships vulnerable to attack. The first ship refitted, HMAS Sydney, was initially not accepted back into service by the RAN because of the problems, which also prevented any refitted ship from serving in a combat zone. Australian Defence Association executives and serving navy personnel have blamed both political parties for the problems: while the Howard Liberal government was responsible for the project, the preceding Labor government chose to maintain the frigates instead of replacing them with the Kidd-class destroyers in the early 1990s.

By November 2008, Darwins upgrade had been completed, while the problems experienced with Sydney had been rectified in both ships. It was planned to start deploying these warships to the Gulf in 2009. The RAN and Thales subsequently claimed that the two upgraded ships were the "most capable ships in the history of the RAN", and that once the other two Adelaides were upgraded, the navy would possess the "most lethal frigate fleet on earth". It was reported at the same time that other nations operating guided missile frigates, including the United States, Canada, Greece, and Turkey, were considering similar upgrades.

After the four surviving Adelaide-class ships were refitted, they were capable of firing SM-2MR and RGM-84 Harpoon missiles from the Mark 13 launcher. An 8-cell Mark 41 Vertical Launch System for Evolved Sea Sparrow Missile had also been installed forward of the Mark 13 launcher. The Phalanx CIWS was upgraded to Block 1B, and the torpedoes, missiles, and other ship-mounted weapons were upgraded to the latest versions.

Fates
Canberra and Adelaide were decommissioned to offset the cost of upgrading the remaining four ships, with Canberra decommissioned on 12 November 2005 and Adelaide on 19 January 2008.

Adelaide was converted into a dive wreck, but plans to scuttle her off Avoca Beach, New South Wales in April 2010 were postponed following protests by resident action groups and a tribunal hearing, which ordered the removal of wiring and paint from sections of the frigate before she was sunk on 13 April 2011.

Sydney entered port for the final time in February 2015, but remained commissioned as an alongside training ship until 7 November. In May 2017, having not received any offers to convert the hull for use as a dive wreck, Sydney was sold for scrap.

Darwin arrived in Sydney for the last time on 1 November 2017, prior to her decommissioning ceremony on 9 December.

The upgraded Adelaide-class frigates were replaced by three new Hobart class Air Warfare Destroyers, equipped with the Aegis combat system, starting around 2016.

In April 2017, the Polish government officially expressed interest in purchasing two of the remaining three frigates when they are retired from service. Negotiations between the Australian and Polish Governments for the sale were unsuccessful. In January 2019 the Greek Government sent an expression of interest to the Department of Defence for Melbourne and Newcastle. In May 2019 it was reported that Chile had also showed interest in the two frigates. On 27 December 2019, it was announced that Melbourne and Newcastle had been sold to Chile.
 On 15 April 2020 the ships were handed over to the Chilean Navy and renamed "Capitan Prat" FFG-11 (ex HMAS Newcastle), and "Almirante Latorre" FFG-14 (ex HMAS Melbourne)

Ships

References

Citation
Books

 

Journal articles

News articles

 

Websites and other media

Further reading

External links

Guided Missile Frigate (FFG), Royal Australian Navy webpage for the class

Frigate classes